was a Japanese physician and poet, known mainly for his poems in the modern waka style. Irako was born in Tottori Prefecture. His collection Kujaku-bune (The Peacock Boat), published in 1906 and 1929, is his best-known work.

References 
 Louis Frédéric, Käthe Roth, Japan Encyclopedia, Harvard University Press, 2002, page 393. .
 Ohio State University library wiki entry

Japanese male poets
1877 births
1946 deaths
20th-century Japanese poets
Date of birth missing
Date of death missing
People from Tottori Prefecture
Writers from Tottori Prefecture
20th-century male writers